Ripley is a census-designated place community in east Riverside County. It is located along State Route 78 (SR78) between Palo Verde and Blythe. The area is mostly agricultural lands irrigated by Colorado River water. The population was 692 at the 2010 census.

History

Ripley was established in 1920 when the California Southern Railroad (unrelated to the railroad linking Barstow and San Diego) was extended from Blythe. The townsite was named to dedicate former Santa Fe Railway president Edward Payson Ripley. The town aimed to be a resort location until it was damaged by a flood that swept part of the valley in 1922. Today, a water tower remains as a landmark in town.

Ripley is near the site of a 1974 fatal bus wreck.

Geography
Alongside Blythe and Palo Verde, Ripley is located in the Palo Verde Valley.

It is within area code 760 and has its own ZIP Code: 92272.

Climate
This area has a large amount of sunshine year round due to its stable descending air and high pressure.  According to the Köppen Climate Classification system, Ripley has a desert climate, abbreviated "Bwh" on climate maps.

Situation
The area is largely irrigated agriculture. Farms in the area include operations owned by David Brown and Sons, Lawrence Chaffin Farms, and Red River Farms. The Metropolitan Water District has made an agreement with the United States Bureau of Reclamation to fallow land in the area in order to conserve water. Farmers will be paid not to grow crops so that the water can be used for other purposes. The area is served by Palo Verde Irrigation District and formerly the Arizona and California Railroad. The railroad's Blythe Division track ends just west of Ripley.

Demographics
The 2010 United States Census reported that Ripley had a population of 692. The racial makeup of Ripley was 393 (56.8%) White, 103 (14.9%) African American, 2 (0.3%) Native American, 1 (0.1%) Asian, 4 (0.6%) Pacific Islander, 165 (23.8%) from other races, and 24 (3.5%) from two or more races. Hispanic or Latino of any race were 537 persons (77.6%). 

The Census reported that 692 people (100% of the population) lived in households, 0 (0%) lived in non-institutionalized group quarters, and 0 (0%) were institutionalized.

There were 218 households, out of which 123 (56.4%) had children under the age of 18 living in them, 95 (43.6%) were opposite-sex married couples living together, 63 (28.9%) had a female householder with no husband present, 18 (8.3%) had a male householder with no wife present.  There were 22 (10.1%) unmarried opposite-sex partnerships, and 1 (0.5%) same-sex married couples or partnerships. 33 households (15.1%) were made up of individuals, and 9 (4.1%) had someone living alone who was 65 years of age or older. The average household size was 3.17.  There were 176 families (80.7% of all households); the average family size was 3.49.

The population was spread out, with 264 people (38.2%) under the age of 18, 85 people (12.3%) aged 18 to 24, 131 people (18.9%) aged 25 to 44, 148 people (21.4%) aged 45 to 64, and 64 people (9.2%) who were 65 years of age or older.  The median age was 24.8 years. For every 100 females, there were 98.3 males.  For every 100 females age 18 and over, there were 82.9 males.

The homeowner vacancy rate was 2.5%; the rental vacancy rate was 25.8%.  249 people (36.0% of the population) lived in owner-occupied housing units and 443 people (64.0%) lived in rental housing units.

References

U.S. Geological Survey, National Geographic Names Database
Map: "Ripley, California, 7.5-minute Quadrangle," U.S. Geological Survey, 1975.
Map: "Road Map of California, 1958," (Sacramento, California: Department of Public Works, Division of Highways, 1958).

External links
 Ripley weather records from University of California Agricultural Extension.
 Wind and other data from Ripley.
 Ripley Fire Station.

Census-designated places in Riverside County, California
Populated places in the Colorado Desert
Communities in the Lower Colorado River Valley
Populated places in the Sonoran Desert
Census-designated places in California